is a train station in Yamashina-ku, Kyoto, Japan.

Lines
Keihan Electric Railway
Keishin Line

Layout

Adjacent stations

Railway stations in Kyoto Prefecture
Stations of Keihan Electric Railway